Birganj is an upazila of Dinajpur District in the division of Rangpur, Bangladesh.

Geography
Birganj is located "between 25°48' and 26°04' north latitudes and in between 88°29´ and 88°44´ east longitudes". It is situated on the bank of Dhepa river, midway between Dinajpur and Thakurgaon. It has 42,323 households and total area 413 km2.

The upazila is bounded by Thakurgaon sadar and Debiganj upazilas on the north, Kaharole upazila on the south, Atrai River and Khansama upazila on the east, Bochaganj, Pirganj upazila of Rangpur and Thakurgaon Sadar upazila on the west.

Demographics
As of the 1991 Bangladesh census, Birganj has a population of 231,305. Males constitute 51.77% of the population, and females 48.23%. This upazila's over-18 population is 111,160. Birganj has an average literacy rate of 25% (7+ years), compared with the national average of 32.4%.

Administration
Birganj Upazila, primarily formed as a Thana in 1890, was turned into upazila in 1983.

The upazila is divided into Birganj Municipality and 11 union parishads namely: Bhognagar, Mohammadpur, Mohonpur, Moricha, Nijpara, Paltapur, Polashbari, Sator, Shatagram, Shibrampur, and Sujalpur. The union parishads are subdivided into 186 mauzas and 187 villages.

Birganj Municipality is subdivided into 9 wards and 11 mahallas.

Education
Birganj Pilot Government High School

Birganj Government College 

Birganj Womens' College

Notable residents
 Abdullah Al Kafi was the Member of Parliament for constituency Dinajpur-1 from 2001 until his death in 2005.

See also
Upazilas of Bangladesh
Districts of Bangladesh
Divisions of Bangladesh
Birganj a town in northern part Dinajpur district of Bangladesh.

References

Upazilas of Dinajpur District, Bangladesh